Obafemi is both a surname and a given name. Notable people with the name include:

Abiodun Obafemi (born 1973), Nigerian footballer
Michael Obafemi (born 2000), Irish footballer
Obafemi Anibaba, Nigerian civil servant and businessman
Obafemi Awolowo (1909–1987), Nigerian politician and leader
Obafemi Ayanbadejo (born 1975), American football fullback
Obafemi Lasode (born 1955), Nigerian actor
Obafemi Martins (born 1984), Nigerian football player

See also
Obafemi Awolowo University, a government-owned and operated Nigerian university